The 2021 Virginia Tech Hokies baseball team represents Virginia Tech during the 2021 NCAA Division I baseball season. The Hokies will play their home games at English Field as a member of the Atlantic Coast Conference. They are led by head coach John Szefc, in his 4th season at Virginia Tech.

Previous season

The 2020 Virginia Tech Hokies baseball team notched a 11–5 (1–2) regular season record. The season prematurely ended on March 12, 2020 due to concerns over the COVID-19 pandemic.

Personnel

Roster

Coaching staff

Game log

Rankings

References

External links 
 VT Baseball

Virginia Tech Hokies
Virginia Tech Hokies baseball seasons
Virginia Tech Hokies baseball